The Monkees' 1995 Greatest Hits album was the third so titled to date. It was issued when Rhino Records took over the Monkees' catalog, and was intended to replace the existing Arista compilations. It has since been superseded by The Monkees Anthology and The Best of the Monkees.

Track listing

Notes
All songs are in stereo except "(I'm Not Your) Steppin' Stone," "A Little Bit Me, a Little Bit You," "Pleasant Valley Sunday," and "Words" which are in mono.
"A Little Bit Me, a Little Bit You" and "The Girl I Knew Somewhere" are not original mixes but the 1987 remixes as first released on the CD version of The Monkees Greatest Hits (Arista) in 1987.
"Valleri" does not fade out but has the "cold ending" as first released on Then & Now... The Best of The Monkees in 1986.

References

1995 greatest hits albums
The Monkees compilation albums
Rhino Records compilation albums